The Menagerie was a professional wrestling stable in Total Nonstop Action Wrestling (TNA).

History
In March 2014, Knux started a new storyline where he returns to his flood-ravaged hometown with his father's carnival having been ruined and the relationship with his father soured because Knux has no intention to follow his father's footsteps and to own the family operated carnival, as well as salvaging it.  The following month, Knux debuted his new stable called The Menagerie, composed of himself, Rebel, Crazzy Steve and The Freak. On the May 8th episode of Impact Wrestling, The Menagerie made their televised debut with Knux defeating Kazarian in Knux's return match. The following week, Crazzy Steve fought Kazarian to a no contest after Steve pants'd the referee in his in-ring debut. On June 15, 2014, at Slammiversary XII, Crazzy Steve took part in a 6 way Ladder match for the TNA X Division Championship which was won by Sanada. On the July 3, episode of Impact Wrestling, The Menagerie (Knux and The Freak) unsuccessfully challenged The Wolves (Davey Richards and Eddie Edwards) in a three way tag team match for the TNA World Tag Team Championships The BroMans (Jessie Godderz and DJ Z) were also included in the match.

On the September 10, episode of Impact Wrestling The BroMans (Jessie Godderz and Robbie E) teamed with Velvet Sky defeating The Menagerie (Knux, Crazzy Steve and Rebel). On the September 17, episode of Impact Wrestling during a Knockouts Battle Royal, Rebel legitimately fractured her arm when she landed on the steel steps when Havok knocked her over the top rope. On the September 24 edition of Impact Wrestling, Knux took part in the Gold Rush tournament for a potential title opportunity facing Austin Aries in a losing effort. Rebel made her in-ring return teaming with Crazzy Steve and Knux on the October 15 episode of Impact Wrestling, defeating Angelina Love and The BroMans (Jessie Godderz and DJ Z). On the November 12 edition of Impact Wrestling, The Menagerie defeated BroMans and The Beautiful People in an Elimination Match. On May 15 episode of Impact Wrestling Rebel participated in a Knockouts tag team match, in which it was referenced that The Menagerie had gone back to the carnival business, signalling the disbanding of the group. On May 19, 2015, Knux left TNA.

Championships and Accomplishments

Total Nonstop Action Wrestling
TNA World Cup of Wrestling (2015) – Crazzy Steve with Jeff Hardy, Gunner, Gail Kim, Davey Richards and Rockstar Spud

References 

Impact Wrestling teams and stables